County routes in Allegany County, New York, are signed with the Manual on Uniform Traffic Control Devices-standard yellow-on-blue pentagon route marker. The signing of county routes in Allegany County began in 1957, as part of a sponsored project with volunteer firefighters.

Route list

Notes

See also

County routes in New York

References

External links
Empire State Roads – Allegany County Roads